El Vergel culture was a South American archaeological culture known in the historical region of Araucania. Its type site lies near the city of Angol. The culture expressed itself first as Vergel I and then with some Inca influence as Vergel II.

See also
El Molle culture
Cuel

References

Bibliography

Archaeological cultures of South America
Mapuche history
History of Araucanía Region
History of Biobío Region